Dax Gamarde basket 40 is a French professional basketball team.

In 2019, the year of promotion to the National 1, the club's president Jean Lamaignère praised the substantive work carried out jointly with local communities to convince federal authorities to endorse the club's qualification which was obtained through a victory over Union sportive Avignon-Le Pontet basket-ball.

Notable players
- Set a club record or won an individual award as a professional player.
- Played at least one official international match for his senior national team at any time.
  Gauthier Darrigand  
  Cedric Mansare

Head Coach position
  Denis Mettay 2019-present

References

External links
Eurobasket.com profile

Basketball teams in France
Sport in Landes (department)